The Steinway Street station is a local station on the IND Queens Boulevard Line of the New York City Subway. Located under Steinway Street between Broadway and 34th Avenue, it is served by the M train on weekdays, the R train at all times except nights, and the E and F trains at night.

History 

The Queens Boulevard Line was one of the first lines built by the city-owned Independent Subway System (IND), and stretches between the IND Eighth Avenue Line in Manhattan and 179th Street and Hillside Avenue in Jamaica, Queens. The Queens Boulevard Line was in part financed by a Public Works Administration (PWA) loan and grant of $25 million. One of the proposed stations would have been located at Steinway Street.

In 2019, as part of an initiative to increase the accessibility of the New York City Subway system, the MTA announced that it would install elevators at the Steinway Street station as part of the MTA's 2020–2024 Capital Program. In November 2022, the MTA announced that it would award a $965 million contract for the installation of 21 elevators across eight stations, including Steinway Street. A joint venture of ASTM and Halmar International would construct the elevators under a public-private partnership.

Station layout 

This underground station has two tracks and two side platforms. Both platform walls have a Grape trim line with a black border and mosaic name tablets reading "STEINWAY ST." in white sans-serif lettering on a black background and Grape border. Small tile captions reading "STEINWAY" in white on black run below the trim line, and directional signs in the same style are present under some of the name tablets. Royal purple I-beam columns run along both platforms at regular intervals, alternating ones having the standard black station name plate with white lettering.

South of this station, the express tracks rejoin the local tracks and the line becomes four tracks again.

Exits

There are two separate mezzanines, one at each end of the station, and crossover is allowed on both of them. The side on Steinway Street near Broadway has two street stairs and has a token booth, and used to be the full-time side to the station. This side has two small staircases to the southbound side and a single platform-wide staircase on the northbound side. The part-time side at 34th Avenue and Steinway Street currently has no booth (it had been completely dismantled for asbestos abatement), and is HEET turnstile access at all times. This side has two stairs to the street to the northeast and southwest corners, and one to each platform. 

In 2003, the hours for this token booth were 6:10 a.m. to 1:45 p.m. Mondays through Saturdays. The entrances on this side, at the time, were only open 6:10 a.m. to 11:30 a.m. Mondays through Fridays, 6:10 a.m. to 12:00 a.m. Saturdays, and 4:20 a.m. to 12:00 a.m. Sundays. In 2009, the MTA proposed closing the part-time booth, which was then open 6:10 a.m. to 1:30 p.m. Mondays through Saturdays. Access to this entrance has been added through HEET access between 2003 and 2009.

References

External links 

 
 Station Reporter — R Train
 Station Reporter — M Train
 The Subway Nut — Steinway Street Pictures
 Broadway entrance from Google Maps Street View
 34th Avenue entrance from Google Maps Street View
 Platforms from Google Maps Street View

IND Queens Boulevard Line stations
1933 establishments in New York City
New York City Subway stations in Queens, New York
Railway stations in the United States opened in 1933
Astoria, Queens